Alberto Abdiel Quintero Medina (born 18 December 1987) is a Panamanian professional footballer who plays for Peruvian club Cienciano and the Panama national team as a winger.

Club career

Early years and Spain
Nicknamed Negrito, Quintero was born in Panama City. After beginning in his country with Chorrillo F.C. he moved to Spain in the summer of 2008, playing amateur football with Torrellano CF in Elche.

After a sole season Quintero joined FC Cartagena, three levels above his previous and just returned to the Segunda División. He struggled tremendously while adjusting to his new team, namely in an incident at Real Betis on 27 September 2009 (0–0 draw) where he was subjected to constant racist abuse by the opposing fans. His debut in the competition took place on 5 September, coming on as a late substitute in a 2–0 home win against Rayo Vallecano.

In 2011, after one season in the Segunda División B with Ontinyent CF, Quintero returned to his country and Chorrillo.

Mexico
Following a successful campaign for Panama at the 2013 CONCACAF Gold Cup, Quintero caught the attention of C.F. Pachuca, who was due to sign him in August 2013. Nothing came of it, but he moved to another club in Mexico, Ascenso MX's Lobos BUAP.

After spells at C.F. Mérida and Mineros de Zacatecas, Quintero returned to BUAP in January 2015. Eleven months later, he was loaned to San Jose Earthquakes of Major League Soccer, scoring two of his three goals on 12 May in the 3–1 home victory over Houston Dynamo FC.

Quintero joined Peruvian Primera División side Club Universitario de Deportes on 30 January 2017. He scored a career-best 13 goals in his first season.

International career
Quintero was part of the Panama squad that participated in the 2007 FIFA U-20 World Cup in Canada. He made his full debut that same year, in a friendly against Guatemala.

Quintero represented his country in 14 FIFA World Cup qualification matches, and was selected for the 2013 CONCACAF Gold Cup, helping the Canaleros to finish second in the United States. He was also picked for the following edition, scoring in the group stage opener against Haiti (1–1).

In May 2018, Quintero was named in Panama's final 23-man squad for the upcoming edition of the FIFA World Cup in Russia. On 6 June, however, he suffered a fractured foot in a friendly with Norway after a collision with Bjørn Johnsen, thus being ruled out of the tournament and replaced by Ricardo Ávila.

On 5 September 2019, Quintero played his 100th match against Bermuda.

International goals
 Panama score listed first, score column indicates score after each Quintero goal.

See also
List of footballers with 100 or more caps

References

External links

1987 births
Living people
Sportspeople from Panama City
Panamanian footballers
Association football wingers
Liga Panameña de Fútbol players
Unión Deportivo Universitario players
Segunda División players
Segunda División B players
FC Cartagena footballers
Ontinyent CF players
Categoría Primera A players
Independiente Medellín footballers
Lobos BUAP footballers
C.F. Mérida footballers
Major League Soccer players
San Jose Earthquakes players
Peruvian Primera División players
Club Universitario de Deportes footballers
Cienciano footballers
Panama international footballers
2011 CONCACAF Gold Cup players
2013 Copa Centroamericana players
2013 CONCACAF Gold Cup players
2014 Copa Centroamericana players
2015 CONCACAF Gold Cup players
Copa América Centenario players
2019 CONCACAF Gold Cup players
2021 CONCACAF Gold Cup players
Panamanian expatriate footballers
Expatriate footballers in Spain
Expatriate footballers in Colombia
Expatriate footballers in Mexico
Expatriate soccer players in the United States
Expatriate footballers in Peru
Panamanian expatriate sportspeople in Spain
Panamanian expatriate sportspeople in Colombia
Panamanian expatriate sportspeople in Mexico
Panamanian expatriate sportspeople in the United States
Panamanian expatriate sportspeople in Peru
FIFA Century Club